Christo Pimpirev is a Bulgarian scientist (geologist) and polar explorer.

Academic career 
He was born on Friday, 13 February 1953 in Sofia, Bulgaria. After graduating from Sofia University with a master's degree in geology in 1978 and getting his PhD in 1986, he became an associate professor till 2004 and a full-time professor in 2005 in Sofia University “St. Kliment Ohridski”. In 2017, he defended his dissertation on "Stratigraphy and Geological Evolution of Livingston Island during the Cretaceous Period" and acquired the degree of Doctor of Science.

Prof. Pimpirev is a doyen of the Bulgarian Antarctic Program, He took part in the first Bulgarian Antarctic Expedition during the 1987/88 austral summer, and has been the leader of the annual Bulgarian scientific campaigns in Antarctica from 1993 until now. He became the founding father of the Bulgarian Antarctic Institute and its director since 1993 up to now. He is also a director of the National Center for Polar Research from 2007 up to now.

The discovery of the Upper Tithonian ammonite in 2003, in the vicinity of the Bulgarian Antarctic base, revealed itself to be one of Pimpirev’s most satisfying scientific career achievements. Indeed, the breakthrough that occurred there changed the established knowledge of the evolution of the Gondwana continent.

He has participated in research expeditions to Mount Ama Dablam, Nepal Himalayas in Speleological expedition in China Karst Plateau in a project for gold searching in Vietnam, in Colombian Andes research, in Canadian-Bulgarian expedition to Ellesmere Island, Canadian Arctic.

Christo Pimpirev is teaching Historical Geology and Palaeogeography, he has been a lecturer in the United States, Portugal, Uruguay, Chile, Colombia, Germany, Great Britain, France, Spain, Argentina, Canada, South Korea and many others countries. He is an author of 7 books, 7 popular science films and more than 250 scientific publications in leading Bulgarian and foreign magazines.

He is the first official representative of Bulgaria who visited South Pole - on January 8, 2013. Prof. Pimpirev steps on the southernmost point of the planet as member of an international expedition dedicated to the 100th anniversary of the conquest of the South Pole from Roald Amundsen and Robert Scott.

Pimpirev Glacier and Pimpirev Beach on Livingston Island, South Shetland Islands are named for Christo Pimpirev.

Membership in international organizations 
 Representative of the Republic of Bulgaria in the Scientific Committee on Antarctic Research since 1994.
 Representative of the Republic of Bulgaria to the Council of Managers of National Antarctic Programs since 1994, EXCOM member in the period 2006-2009.
 Representative of the Republic of Bulgaria in the Antarctic Treaty Consultative Meetings since 1995.
 Representative of the Republic of Bulgaria in the European Polar Board (EPB) since 2001, EXCOM member in the period 2009-2012.

Awards 
 Order of Saints Cyril and Methodius (1st Class)
 Highest Mongolian state order "Polar Star" - for merits in the creation of Mongolian Antarctic Institute and laying the foundations of Mongolian research in Antarctica
 Jubilee Medal of Sofia University "St. Kliment Ohridski" (1st Class)
 "Golden Book" for contribution to the development of the Bulgarian Science and Culture
 First winner of the Honorary badge for contribution to Bulgarian national ideals established by VMRO
 Honorary Citizen of Lyaskovets town
 Memorial plaque of the Committee for Environmental Protection in the Antarctic Treaty Consultative Meeting (ATCM) - for his active role in the environmental protection of Antarctica

Books 
 Kamenov B. c. Pimpirev 1993. Touching the Antarctic St. Kliment Ohridski University Press, Sofia
 Pimpirev, Ch., Balabanski, D. 1998. Ice magic, St. Kliment Ohridski University Press, Sofia
 Pimpirev, Ch., Davidov, N. 2003. Antarctica: The Extreme South. St. Kliment Ohridski University Press, Sofia
 Pimpirev, Ch., 2010. History of the Earth, St. Kliment Ohridski University Press, Sofia, second edition
 Pimpirev, Ch., 2013. Antarctic Diaries, St. Kliment Ohridski University Press, Sofia
 Pimpirev, Ch., 2014. Los diarios de la Antartida, St. Kliment Ochridski University Press, Sofia
 Pimpirev, Ch., Chipev, N., 2015. Bulgarian Antarctic Research, St. Kliment Ochridski University Press, Sofia
 Pimpirev, Ch., 2017. Antarctica - cold south, Avliga Press, Sofia
 Pimpirev, Ch., 2019. History of the Earth, St. Kliment Ohridski University Press, Sofia, third edition

Popular science films 
 "Expedition to Antarctica" - National Television, Atlas Program (1988) - author
 "Bulgaria in Antarctica" - National Television, Atlas Program (1994) - author
 "Southern Summer" - National Television, Atlas Program (1995) - author
 "Bulgaria on two oceans" - National TV, Atlas program (1996) - scriptwriter
 "Under the Sign of the Southern Cross" - National Television (2006) - writer
 "Antarctica 2012" - Films Author (2012) – consultant
 “90 degrees South” (2014) – Bulgarian National Television - author
 "Antarctica - Ice Love" (2015) - BTV - author
 "One Antarctic summer" (2018) - Bulgarian Antarctic Institute - producer

Feature films 

 „Letters from Antarctica”(2019) – Lenta Films. Director: Stanislav Donchev; Writers: Georgi Ivanov, Nevena Kertova; Stars: Diana Dimitrova, Irmena Chichikova, Ivan Stamenov, Christo Pimpirev; Consultant: Christo Pimpirev. A single mother, wanting to protect her eight-year-old son from pain, lies to him that his dad is away with the Antarctic expedition. But postponing the confession about the father's death, causes damage to her and her son. Some of the film's pictures were indeed taken on the Icy continent during a Bulgarian expedition to Livingston Island. Christo Pimpirev himself plays the role of leader of the Bulgarian polar expedition. With the footage filmed in Antarctica, the film sets a precedent in the making of feature films in the world.

Notes

External links 
 
 Hristo Pimpirev: It is great honor for me to be the first to take Bulgarian flag to South Pole, FOCUS News Agency, December 29, 2012
 Antarctica to Host Permanent Settlements in 50 Years, www.novinite.com, July 31, 2012
 New Year’s Eve in Antarctica, Tania Harizanova, Radio Bulgaria, December 27, 2012
 Bulgaria is respected nation in Antarctica and has excellent relations with other Antarctic nations, FOCUS News Agency, October 03, 2011
 Foreign Policy Is Made in Antarctic Too, Standart Newspaper, April 5, 2004
 Dreams Are Sweetest in Antarctica, Standart Newspaper, January 27, 2004

1953 births
Living people
Bulgarian geologists
Explorers of Antarctica
Scientists from Sofia
Bulgarian explorers